Shahid Mahmud Jangi Chowdhury (born 6 February, Chittagong, Bangladesh), known professionally as Shahid Mahumd Jangi, is a Bangladeshi lyricist and author.

Early life and education 
Shahid Mahmud Jangi was born in Chittagong, Bangladesh to father L.A Chowdhury and mother Hamida Chowdhury. He graduated from the University of Chittagong with a bachelor's degree in management (Honors) and a Master of Management. He was very active in school, organizing and playing the lead role in plays and participating in school radio programs.

Career 
After earning a master's degree in management, Jangi joined as a lecturer at Omergani M E S College Chittagong. He started his own business with an advertising firm and simultaneously started another business in the service industry.

Works

Author 
Jangi used to write articles and lyrics from an early age and released his first song “Alo chayte” composed by Naquib Khan in 1978, telecast on Bangladesh Television (BTV). Jangi has published numerous articles in national and local newspapers.

Publications 
Nilamborir Shari Pore

Ekdin Ghum Bhanga Shohore

Lyricist 
Shahid Mahmud Jangi started writing songs in 1977. He has carved a niche for himself in the field of songwriting with a number of hit songs for many pioneering Bangladeshi bands and soloists. Jangi shared his thoughts on the state of music in Bangladesh.

Jangi wrote the patriotic song, Mukto Manik Pabar Ashaye Amra Dichchhi Pari for Souls’ second album. He also penned Dik-e Dik-e Ahajari Shobar Chokkhe Pani, Protidin Protiti Muhurto Keno Chute Jetam Tomar Kachhe, Tumi Ami Noy Aj Cholo Gai Gaan,Oi Dekho Gaichhe Paul Robson...Dekho Dukhi Janata Egiye Chole, Tader-i Gaan Kore Bob Marley, Cha-er Cup-e Porichoy Tomar Sathey and Anobik Aghate Hiroshima Kande for the band.

Jangi also wrote songs like Aj Je Shishu Prithibir Aloye Eshechhe, Tritiyo Bishwa Emoni Ek Bishwa, Hey Bangladesh, Tomar Boyosh Holo Koto and many others for Renaissance.

He has also written all the songs for Pilu Khan's upcoming solo album, Tomra Bhalo Acho To? Having penned captivating songs for multiple renowned artists over the years, Jangi aspires to keep doing what he loves."ঘুম ভাঙ্গা শহরে (In the Woke Up City)"  was also the first rock song of Bangladesh and the song was written by legendary lyricist Shahid Mahmud Jangi.

Over the years, he has gained success in songwriting, emerging as a legendary lyricist of Bangladesh. Besides traditional and colloquial songs, he has whelmed many patriotic anthems in the pop and rock genres. His topics of songs comprise love, hardships, as well as songs about growing up in Bangladesh. Music lovers have called him a lyricist with a different style. Many renowned singers and composers have acknowledged and accredited him for his contributions to their carrier.

There are many article published about him in several newspapers and online portals.

Discography 
 “Ridoy kadamatir kono murti Aghat dile bhenge zabe” composed by Naquib khan. Sang by Rennessaince, Nilufar Yasmin.
 "Ekdin Ghum Bhanga Shohore" LRB's first song, composed by Ayub Bachchu.
 "Somoy Jeno Katena" sung by Samina Chowdhury, composed by Shahbaz Khan Pilu.
 "Harano Bikeler Golpo" Ayub Bachchu's first solo song, composed by Ayub Bachchu.
 "Dokhina hawa" sung by Partha Barua.
 "Amar Golpo" sung by Shahbaz Khan Pilu.

References 

Year of birth missing (living people)
Living people
University of Chittagong alumni